The Alexander Noble House, built in 1875, is a historic Greek Revival farmhouse located in Fish Creek, Door County, Wisconsin on Wisconsin Highway 42. The house was listed on the National Register of Historic Places on February 23, 1996.

Description and history 
Alexander Noble, one of the founders of Fish Creek, was born in Edinburgh, Scotland in 1829 and moved to Fish Creek in 1863. He served the community as blacksmith, postmaster, town chairman, and county board member.

Today, the restored Noble House contains many of its original furnishings and artifacts. The home's authentic room settings depict the period from 1875 to 1900. The house offers tours that portray life in Door County over a century ago, depicting the village as a thriving fishing and shipping village with horse-drawn wagons traveling the dirt streets.

The house is run as a nonprofit institution operated by the Gibraltar Historical Association, Box 323, Fish Creek, WI 54212.

References

External links
 The Door County Historic Noble House
Noble house reflects character of its owner by John Kahlert, Door County Advocate, March 18, 1976

Historic house museums in Wisconsin
Houses on the National Register of Historic Places in Wisconsin
Museums in Door County, Wisconsin
Scottish-American history
Houses in Door County, Wisconsin
National Register of Historic Places in Door County, Wisconsin
Houses completed in 1868
Greek Revival houses in Wisconsin